Kohl, kajal or kajol is an ancient eye cosmetic, traditionally made by grinding stibnite (Sb2S3) for use similar to that of charcoal in mascara. It is widely used in the Middle East, Caucasus and North Africa, South Asia, West Africa, and the Horn of Africa as eyeliner to contour and/or darken the eyelids and as mascara for the eyelashes. It is worn mostly by women, but also by some men and children.  The content of kohl and various ways to prepare it differ based on tradition and country. Several studies have questioned the safety of kohl due to the dangers of lead poisoning.

Name

The Arabic name   formed the Arabic root k-ḥ-l, "to apply kohl". Transliteration variants of Arabic dialectal pronunciation include kohl or kuhl. The Arabic word cognates with Syriac-Aramaic word ܟܘܚܠܐ/כוחלא kuḥla. Both words derived from Akkadian 𒎎𒋆𒁉𒍣𒁕 guẖlu(m) meaning stibium.

The English word alcohol is a loan of the Arabic word (via Middle Latin and French; originally in the sense "powder of antimony", the modern meaning is from the 18th century).

The Persian word for kohl is سرمه sormeh, from Azerbaijani sürmə "drawing along", which has led to Bengali and Urdu surma ( সুর্মা, سرمہ) as well as Russian . In some South Asian languages, the term kājal or kajol is used.

The Greek and Latin terms for antimony, stibium, στίβι, στίμμι, were borrowed from the Egyptian name .

In Hausa, it is also known as tozali and kwalli.

Middle East and North Africa

Kohl has been worn traditionally since the Protodynastic Period of Egypt (c. 3100 BCE) by Egyptians of all social classes, originally as protection against eye ailments. There was also a belief that darkening around the eyes would protect one from the harsh rays of the sun.

Galena eye paint (later termed Kohl in Arabic from the Akkadian word for the cosmetic) was widely applied in Ancient Egypt. Upper eyelids were painted black and lower ones were colored green, as depicted in ancient texts that describe the use of both black galena and green malachite. Ancient graves from the pre-historic Tasian culture point to the early application of galena in Egypt, a custom stretching from as old as the Badarian period through to Greco-Roman era. Although found locally, both black galena and green malachite were also imported from nearby regions in Western Asia, Coptos, and the Land of Punt.

The 18th Dynasty Ancient Egyptian Queen Hatshepsut would also grind charred frankincense into kohl eyeliner. This is the first recorded use of the resin. The frankincense itself had originally been obtained during an expedition to the ancient Land of Punt in this New Kingdom dynasty ( 1500 BCE). Cosmetic ingredients such as cinnamon bark and other spice components – used for fragrances – alongside copper kohl sticks were exported from Tamraparni (ancient Sri Lanka) towns Pomparippu and Kadiramalai-Kandarodai to ancient Egypt.

Additionally, the pioneering Muslim scholar Ibn Abi Shaybah described in a legal compilation how to apply kohl to the eye, as narrated by earlier authorities.

Berber and Semitic women in North Africa and the Middle East, respectively, also apply kohl to their faces. A vertical line is drawn from the bottom lip to the chin and along the bridge of the nose. Originally the line from the bottom lip to the chin showed whether a woman was married or not. This form of using kohl on the face originated from the Arabian Peninsula, and was introduced in the seventh century in North Africa.

Kohl has also been used in Yemen as a cosmetic for a long time. In addition, mothers would apply kohl to their infants' eyes soon after birth. Some did this to "strengthen the child's eyes", and others believed it could prevent the child from being cursed by the evil eye.

Eye paint was worn in ancient Israel as well; one of Job's daughters had the name Keren-Happuch ("horn of eye paint") (Job42:14). Among the Israelites, the eye paint was frequently associated with women of ill repute or evil intent: "When Jehu came to Jezreel, Jezebel heard of it; she painted her eyes with kohl ("wattāśem bappûk"), and adorned her head, and looked out of the window" (2 Kings 9:30). For Jeremiah, Jerusalem can be personified as a prostitute: "And you, O desolate one, what do you mean that you dress in crimson, that you deck yourself with ornaments of gold, that you enlarge your eyes with kohl ("tiqrĕ'ĭ bappûk") ?" (Jer. 4:30). Similarly, Ezekiel portrays unfaithful Jerusalem as the prostitute Oholobah: "They even sent for men to come from far away, to whom a messenger was sent, and they came. For them you bathed yourself, painted ("kaḥal") your eyes, and decked yourself with ornaments" (Ezek. 23:40).

Horn of Africa

Usage of kohl eye paint in the Horn of Africa dates to the ancient Kingdom of Punt. Somali, Djiboutian, Ethiopian, and Eritrean women have long applied kohl (kuul) for cosmetic purposes, as well as to cleanse the eyes, lengthen eyelashes, and to protect the eyes from the sun's rays.

West Africa
Kohl is also applied in parts of West Africa by the Fulani, the Hausa people, and the Tuareg. In addition, it is used by the Wolof, Mandinka, Soninke, Dagomba, Kanuri, and other predominantly Muslim inhabitants of the Sahel and Sahara regions. Kohl is used by both sexes, and by people of all ages, mainly during weddings, Islamic festivals (such as Eid ul Fitr and Eid ul Adha), and trips to the mosque for the weekly Jumuah congregational prayer.

For women, kohl or black-henna is applied to the face as well in a similar manner as that practiced by communities in North Africa.

South Asia

Kohl is known by various names in South Asian languages, like surma in Punjabi, Sylheti and Urdu, raanji in Pashto, kajal in Hindi, aanjan in Gujarati, kajol in Bengali, kajalh in Marathi, kanmashi in Malayalam, kaadige in Kannada, kaatuka in Telugu, and kan mai in Tamil. In India, it is commonly used by women as a type of eyeliner that is put around the edge of the eyes. In many parts of India, especially in Southern India, Karnataka in particular, women of the household prepare the kajal. This homemade kajal is used even for infants. Local tradition considers it to be a very good coolant for the eyes and believes that it protects the eyesight and vision from the sun.

Some Indian Ayurvedic or ancient Indian herbal medicine manufacturing companies add camphor and other medicinal herbs that are beneficial for eyes in their kajal. It can serve not only as a cosmetic but also as medicine for the eyes.

In Punjabi culture, surma is a traditional ceremonial dye, which predominantly men of the Punjab wear around their eyes on special social or religious occasions. It is usually applied by the wife or the mother of the person.

Some women also add a dot of kajal on the left side of the foreheads or on the waterline of the eye of women and children to ward off buri nazar, also known as buri nozor. Buri nazar literally means 'bad glance' and is comparable to the 'evil eye', although it can be interpreted as ill-wishes of people or even lustful eyes, in the sense of men ogling women. It signifies that the person is not perfect, with them having 'black mark', and hence, people wouldn't be jealous of their beauty.

In the centuries-old Indian Bharatanatyam and Odissi dances, the dancers apply heavy kohl to their eyes so as to draw attention to their eye gestures and movement. The kohl is then applied to eyebrows and eyelids to add further enhancement to the dancers.

Kohl and Islam

In Islam, Muhammad used kohl and it is used by many Muslim men today during Ramadan as a sign of devotion.

Preparation
Preparation of homemade kajal begins with dipping a clean, white, thin muslin cloth, about ten by ten centimetres square, in sandalwood paste or the juice of Alstonia scholaris (Manjal karisilanganni), which is then dried in the shade. This dip and dry process is done all day long. After sunset, a wick is made out of the cloth, which is then used to light a mud lamp filled with castor oil. A brass vessel is kept over the lamp, leaving a little gap, just enough for the oxygen to aid the burning of the lamp. This is left burning overnight. In the morning, one or two drops of pure ghee (clarified cow's butter) or castor oil are added to the soot which now lines the brass vessel. It is then stored in a clean dry box.

All the ingredients used in this preparation (sandalwood/Manjal karsilanganni, castor oil, ghee) are believed to have medicinal properties. They are still used in Indian therapies like ayurveda and Siddha medicines.

In rural Bengal, kajol or surma is made from the "Monosha" plant, a type of succulent spurge (Euphorbia neriifolia). The leaf of Monosha is covered with oil and is kept above a burning diya (mud lamp). Within minutes the leaf is covered with creamy soft black soot which is so safe and sterile that it is even applied to infants.

Health concerns
The content of kohl and the recipes to prepare it vary greatly. In North Africa and Middle East, homemade kohl is often made by grinding galena (lead sulfide). Western manufacturers use amorphous carbon or organic charcoal instead of lead. Plant oils and the soot from various nuts, seeds, and gum resins are often added to the carbon powder. The non-lead products are considered to be of inferior quality to the older, traditional varieties and therefore there has been an increase in the use of handmade, lead-based kohl.

For decades, various conflicting reports in the literature have been published relating to kohl application to eyes being responsible for causing higher blood lead concentration, which may cause lead poisoning. At the same time, a number of research studies and reports have also been published refuting any such links with increased blood lead level upon kohl (surma) application.

A group of researchers in China tried to find some scientific basis of this claimed property of lead sulfide (galena) relating to absorption of sun rays when applied into the eyes in the form of kohl. The authors reported the ultraviolet (UV) absorption spectra of a thin film of lead sulfide prepared on "indium tin oxide" (ITO) substrate. The spectra showed that lead sulfide thin films had higher absorption and lower transmittance in the UV light band, which further increases with the increased deposition voltage.

The drive to eliminate lead from kohl was sparked by studies in the early 1990s of preparations of kohl that found high levels of contaminants, including lead. Lead levels in commercial kohl preparations were as high as 84%. Kohl samples from Oman and Cairo, analyzed using X-ray powder diffraction and scanning electron microscopy, were found to contain galena. One decade later, a study of kohl manufactured in Egypt and India found that a third of the samples studied contained lead, while the remaining two-thirds contained amorphous carbon, zincite, cuprite, goethite, elemental silicon or talc, hematite, minium, and organic compounds.

Lead-contaminated kohl use has been linked to increased levels of lead in the bloodstream, putting its users at risk of lead poisoning (also called lead intoxication). Complications of lead poisoning include anemia, growth retardation, low IQ, convulsions, and, in severe cases, death. Anemia from lead poisoning is of special concern in Middle Eastern and South Asian countries where other forms of anemia are prevalent, including iron deficiency anemia (from malnutrition) and hemoglobinopathy (sickle cell anemia, thalassemia).

These banned products are different from lead-free cosmetics that use the term "kohl" only to describe its shade or color, rather than its actual ingredients. Some modern eye cosmetics are marketed as "kohl", but are prepared differently and in accordance with relevant health standards.

Eye cosmetics such as surma are recognized as one of the important sources of lead exposure in Pakistan. As adverse health effects of heavy metals are a public health concern, where especially lead may cause negative health impacts to human fetal  and infantile development, a study in Pakistan of pregnant women's nails in 2016, showed 13 nail samples out of 84 analyzed, contained lead concentration exceeding the (13.6 μg/g) found in a fatal case of lead poisoning. Not the possibility of an external contamination. The observations showed that lead-containing surma consists of fine particle of galena (ore of lead sulfide) in respirable dust range (less than 10 μm) and relative in vitro bioavailability of lead in the surma was determined as 5.2%. Thus, lead-containing surma consists of inhalable and bioavailable particles, and it contributes an increased risk of lead exposure.

"Blue" kohl is a dark-bluish black pigment composed of both lead-based compounds as well as a compound of antimony. The lead-based compounds in kohl are galena (PbS) – dark grey and gloss laurionite (PbCl(OH)) – white phosgenite ((PbCl)2CO3); cerussite (PbCO3) – blue. The antimony-based compound in kohl is stibnite (Sb2S3) – blue.

In January 2010, French researchers reported that the particular heavy eye makeup that ancient Egyptians wore may have had medical benefits. At submicromolar concentrations, the specially made lead compounds can elicit overproduction of nitric oxide (NO), which in turn can trigger an enhancement of the immune response.

The ancient Egyptians, documented in the Ebers Papyrus ( 1550 BCE), discuss these compounds within kohl as protective for the eyes. Indeed, kohl was used an eyeliner and cosmetic. There are a number of endemic ocular diseases in the Nile region including trachoma – which is caused by a chlamydial bacterium and can cause corneal scarring – and conjunctival cicatricial disease, with visual loss. Kohl was used not only as a cosmetic but also as a medicinal collyrium (from Gr. kollurion). Two of kohl's lead compounds – the lead chlorides laurionite and phosgenite – were not natural to the Nile valley. It is believed they were intentionally synthesized by the ancient Egyptians for this purpose. The widespread use of kohl across the Mediterranean and the Middle East attests to its ability to protect the eye from infectious disease and be used as a cosmetic.

Legal status
In the United States, kohl is not on the list of color additives approved by the Food and Drug Administration, which considers kohl unsafe for use due to its potential lead content. It is illegal to import into, or sell in, the United States.

See also
Henna

References

References

Bibliography

 Al-Ashban RM, Aslam M, Shah AH., Public Health. 2004 Jun;118(4):292–8. "Kohl (surma): a toxic traditional eye cosmetic study in Saudi Arabia."
 Abdullah MA., J Trop Med Hyg. 1984 Apr;87(2):67–70. "Lead poisoning among children in Saudi Arabia."
 Hardy AD, Walton RI, Myers KA, Vaishnav R., J Cosmet Sci. 2006 Mar–Apr;57(2):107–25. "Availability and chemical composition of traditional eye cosmetics ('kohls') used in the United Arab Emirates of Dubai, Sharjah, Ajman, Umm Al-Quwain, Ras Al-Khaimah, and Fujairah."
 Shaltout A, Yaish SA, Fernando N., Ann Trop Paediatr. 1981 Dec;1(4):209–15. "Lead encephalopathy in infants in Kuwait. A study of 20 infants with particular reference to clinical presentation and source of lead poisoning."

External links

 Egyptian: Kohl pot, Black steatite. Click on picture.
 Egyptian: Bone kohl pot. Figurine design. Click on picture.
 Kohl (CopperWiki)

Cosmetics
History of cosmetics
Badarian culture
Land of Punt

sv:Kohl (smink)
zh:眼影粉